Athabasca-Wabasca was a provincial electoral district in Alberta mandated to return a single member to the Legislative Assembly of Alberta using first-past-the-post balloting from 1993 to 2004.

Electoral district history
The riding was created in 1993 when the district of Fort McMurray shrank to encompass the northern Alberta city. Athabasca-Wabasca completely covered the same boundaries except for the city of Fort McMurray. The riding was abolished in the 2004 electoral boundary re-distribution when the district of Fort McMurray merged and formed Fort McMurray-Wood Buffalo. The south part of the riding became part of Athabasca-Redwater.

The riding encompassed most of the extreme north east part of the province.

Members of the Legislative Assembly (MLAs)

Election results

1993 general election

1997 general election

2001 general election

See also
List of Alberta provincial electoral districts

References

Further reading

External links
Elections Alberta
The Legislative Assembly of Alberta

Former provincial electoral districts of Alberta